Rantiya (known to the Romans as Rantia and to the Crusaders as Rentie) was a Palestinian village, located 16 kilometers east of Jaffa. During the British Mandate in Palestine, in  1945 it had a population of 590 inhabitants.

Those inhabitants became refugees after a 10 July 1948 assault by Israeli forces from the Palmach's Eighth Armored Brigade and the Third Infantry Battalion of the Alexandroni Brigade during the 1948 Arab-Israeli war.

Of the over 100 houses that made up the village, only three remain standing today. The Jewish localities of Mazor, Nofekh, and Rinatia are located on Rantiya's former lands.

History
The village was situated on a low mound on an ancient site.

During the Crusader era the village was known as Rentie, Rantia, or  Rentia.

In 1122 the tithes  of the  village were  granted to the hospital of the church of St John at Nablus. In 1166, the  tithes   were  granted to the   Knights Hospitaller. A vaulted building in the village, named al-Baubariya,  has been dated to the Crusader  period.

Ottoman era
Rantiya, like the rest of   Palestine, was incorporated into the Ottoman Empire in 1517, and in 1557 the revenues of the village were designated for the new waqf of Hasseki Sultan Imaret in Jerusalem, established by Hasseki Hurrem Sultan (Roxelana),  wife of Suleiman the Magnificent.   In the late 1550s, local disturbances decreased the income from the village by nearly 40%.

In 1596, Rantiya was a village in the nahiya ("subdistrict") of Ramla ( liwa' ("district") of Gaza), with a population of 132. Villagers paid taxes to the authorities for the crops that they cultivated, which included wheat, barley, fruit, and sesame as well as on other types of property, such as goats and beehives. All the villagers were Muslim. All of the revenues; a total of 5,300 Akçe, went to a Waqf.

In 1838 it was noted as a  Muslim   village called Rentieh in the  Lydda administrative region,  while in 1856 the village was named Renthieh on Kiepert's map of Palestine published that year.

In 1870 the French explorer Victor Guérin visited and described the village as partially destroyed, while an Ottoman village list from about the same year showed that   Rantiya had  33 houses and a population of 116, though the population count included men only.

In 1882,  the PEF's Survey of Western Palestine  found  Rantiya  to be  a small village built of adobe bricks. At that time a main road passed right next to it.

British Mandate era

In the 1922 census of Palestine conducted  by the British Mandate authorities,  Rantieh had a population of 351, all  Muslims. increasing  the 1931 census to 411, still all Muslims,  in a total of  105 houses.

By  1945  the population  had increased to 590 Muslims, while the total land area was 4,389 dunams, according to an official land and population survey. Of  this,  505  were allocated  for citrus and bananas, 99 were for  plantations and irrigable land, 3,518 for cereals, while 13 dunams were classified as built-up areas.

1948, and after
In 1992 the village remains were described as "Three deserted houses, standing amid weeds, tall wild grasses, and the debris of several other houses, are all that remains of the village. Two of the deserted houses are made of stone, the third of concrete. All have rectangular doors and windows. Two of them have flat roofs; the third may have had a gabled roof."

References in contemporary culture
In the film Soraida: A Woman of Palestine, by Tahani Rached, the main character explains that she named her daughter and son, Rantia and Aram, after Palestinian villages to preserve the memory of the homeland.

See also
List of villages depopulated during the Arab-Israeli conflict

References

Bibliography

External links
Welcome To Rantiya
 Rantiya, Zochrot
Survey of Western Palestine, Map 13: IAA,  Wikimedia commons
Rantiya at Khalil Sakakini Cultural Center
Ross, KL, 2002,  The Periphery of Francia: Outremer - Kings of Jerusalem and Cyprus, Counts of Edessa, Princes of Antioch, Counts of Tripoli, Kings of Thessalonica, Dukes of Athens, Princes of Achaea, and the Grand Masters of the Military Monastic Orders The Proceedings of the Friesian School, Fourth Series

District of Jaffa
Arab villages depopulated during the 1948 Arab–Israeli War